The name Akang has been used for five tropical cyclones in the Philippines by PAGASA in the Western Pacific.

 Tropical Storm Mamie (1982) (T8201, 01W, Akang), struck the Philippines
 Typhoon Judy (1986), (T8601, 01W, Akang), drifted east of the Philippines, never made landfall
 Tropical Storm Nathan (1990) (T9003, 05W, Akang), crossed the Philippines as a tropical depression, then became a tropical storm in the South China Sea, making landfall at Hainan, China
 Tropical Depression Akang (1994) (01W), a tropical depression that was only recognized by PAGASA and JTWC
 Tropical Depression Akang (1998) (01W), a tropical depression that was only recognized by PAGASA and JTWC

Pacific typhoon set index articles